SAIME (formerly ONIDEX) is a Venezuelan government institution, traditionally in charge of Civil registry services. The name derives from the Spanish acronym for Servicio Administrativo de Identificación, Migración y Extranjería (Administrative Service of Identification, Migration and Foreigners). The function of this government office is to issue passports, identity cards for immigrants, and other legal nationality documents for Venezuelan citizens and residents.

References

External links

 Servicio Administrativo de Identificación Migración y Extranjería (SAIME) 

Executive branch of the government of Venezuela
Identity documents